Columbus was a borax mining boom town in Esmeralda County. Its remnants are located on the edge of the Columbus Salt Marsh.

History
In 1863, a group of Spanish miners discovered silver in the area. The Columbus mining camp was established two years later, when American miners began to mine gold and silver nearby. A stamp mill was moved to town from Aurora in 1866. Columbus was the ideal location for a mill, as it was the only stop for several miles with sufficient amounts of water for the operation of a mill. It wasn't until 1871 that borax was discovered near the town's site, and as a result Columbus increased substantially in its importance.

Borax was discovered at a salt marsh near town by William Troop in 1871. The site later became known as the Columbus Marsh. By 1873, four borax companies were actively working the deposits on the marsh. Columbus' zenith occurred around 1875 when there was around 1,000 people in the town. Borax plants were running continuously day and night, for eight months during the year. The town had a post office and local newspaper, The Borax Miner, an adobe school, an iron foundry. Stage express offered daily service to Fish Lake Valley, Candelaria, and after 1876, Wadsworth.

Columbus declined after 1875 when the Pacific Borax Company built a larger plant at Fish Lake, 30 miles south of town. By 1880, the town population had dwindled to 100 people. By the mid-1880s, mining and commercial activity had ceased in the area, and Columbus slowly became a ghost town.

Notes
William Caruthers, in his "Loafing Along Death Valley Trails" (Ontario: Death Valley Publishing Co., 1951) says that Francis M. "Borax" Smith discovered the borax at Columbus Marsh.

Gallery

References 

1865 establishments in Nevada
Ghost towns in Esmeralda County, Nevada
Ghost towns in Nevada
Nevada historical markers
Mining communities in Nevada
Populated places established in 1865